Ali Maher (born December 3, 1973) is an Egyptian former football striker. He is currently the head coach of Future.

Maher was a member in Al Ahly squad which won CAF Champions League 2001.

International career

Maher made several appearances for the Egypt national football team, including 1994 FIFA World Cup qualification and 1998 FIFA World Cup qualification matches. He also played for Egypt at the 1996 Africa Cup of Nations in South Africa where he scored a goal against Cameroon in the group stage'.

International Goals
Scores and results list Egypt's goal tally first.

Managerial statistics

Source:

Titles and honours

As a player

Al Ahly
 Egyptian Premier League: 1995–96, 1996–97, 1997–98, 1998–99, 1999–2000
 Egypt Cup: 1995–96, 2000–01
 CAF Champions League: 2001
 CAF Super Cup: 2002
 Arab Club Champions Cup: 1996
 Arab Super Cup: 1997, 1998

Egypt
 Arab Nations Cup: 1992

Egypt Olympic Team
 All-Africa Games: 1995

As a manager
Future
 EFA League Cup: 2022

References

External links

 
 

1973 births
Living people
Egyptian footballers
Egypt international footballers
Association football forwards
Al Ahly SC players
1996 African Cup of Nations players
Egyptian Premier League players
Al-Ansar FC (Medina) players
Expatriate footballers in Saudi Arabia
Saudi Professional League players
Egyptian expatriate sportspeople in Saudi Arabia
Pyramids FC managers
Smouha SC managers
ENPPI SC managers
Al Masry SC managers